Tibor Kristóf (20 February 1942 – 2 September 2009) was a Hungarian actor.

Biography 
Besides his own career in Hungarian films and television, Kristóf provided the Hungarian-language voices of many prominent English-speaking Hollywood actors in major American-produced films.

Kristóf provided the Hungarian language voice of Morgan Freeman in the films, The Bucket List and Wanted. He also provided the Hungarian voice over for actors Sean Connery and Peter Gilmore.

Kristóf also provided the voice of Darth Vader in George Lucas' Star Wars films, including Star Wars Episode IV: A New Hope.

Death 
Kristóf died on 2 September 2009 in Budapest at the age 67.

Filmography

References

External links 

1942 births
2009 deaths
Hungarian male film actors
Hungarian male television actors
Hungarian male voice actors
People from Miskolc